South Avenue may refer to:

 South Avenue, Makati
 Timog Avenue in Quezon City, formerly named South Avenue
 South Avenue (Syracuse, New York)
 South Avenue Commercial Historic District, Springfield, Missouri